Duncan House or Duncan Farm may refer to:

In Australia
 Duncan House (Castlecrag), a heritage-listed house in Sydney suburb of Castlerag

In the United States
(by state then city)
 Father William Duncan House, Metlakatla, AK, listed on the NRHP in Alaska
 Duncan House (Harrison, Arkansas), listed on the NRHP in Arkansas
 Hersey-Duncan House, Wilmington, DE, listed on the NRHP in Delaware
 Harry C. Duncan House, Tavarcs, FL, listed on the NRHP in Florida
 Horace Duncan House, Lake City, FL, listed on the NRHP in Florida
 Strange-Duncan House, Carnesville, GA, listed on the NRHP in Georgia
 Duncan Farm (Grafton, Illinois), listed on the NRHP in Illinois
 Smith-Duncan House and Eastman Barn, Grafton, IL, listed on the NRHP in Illinois
 Joseph Duncan House, Jacksonville, IL, listed on the NRHP in Illinois
 Duncan Manor, Towanda, IL, listed on the NRHP in Illinois
 Trippett-Glaze-Duncan Farm, Patoka, IN, listed on the NRHP in Indiana
 John M. Duncan House, Winterset, IA, listed on the NRHP in Iowa
 Duncan-Duitsman Farm Historic District, George, IA, listed on the NRHP in Iowa
 Charles Duncan House, Lawrence, KS, listed on the NRHP in Kansas
 Henry Duncan House, Bloomfield, KY, listed on the NRHP in Kentucky
 Bradshaw-Duncan House, Crestwood, KY, listed on the NRHP in Kentucky
 Duncan House (Franklin, Kentucky), listed on the NRHP in Simpson County, Kentucky
Duncan House (Greenville, Kentucky), contributing building in South Cherry Street Historic District
 J. W. Duncan House, Nicholasville, KY, listed on the NRHP in Kentucky
 Stuart E. and Annie L. Duncan Estate, Louisville, KY, listed on the NRHP in Kentucky
 Duncan House (Springfield, Kentucky), listed on the NRHP in Washington County, Kentucky
 Beecher H. Duncan Farm, Westfield, ME, listed on the NRHP in Maine
 Andrews-Duncan House, Raleigh, NC, listed on the NRHP in North Carolina
 Robert P. Duncan House, Bexley, OH, listed on the NRHP in Ohio
 Donald C. Duncan House, a Frank Lloyd Wright-designed house in Polymath Park in Acme, Pennsylvania
 Bishop William Wallace Duncan House, Spartanburg, SC, listed on the NRHP in South Carolina
 Wright-Henderson-Duncan House, Granbury, TX, listed on the NRHP in Texas
 Duncan, John, Harriet, and Eliza Jennett, House, Centerville, UT, listed on the NRHP in Utah
 Holland-Duncan House, Moneta, VA, listed on the NRHP in Virginia